Genopaschia is a monotypic snout moth genus. It was described by Harrison Gray Dyar Jr. in 1914 and is known from Panama and Puerto Rico. It contains the species Genopaschia protomis.

References

Cacotherapiini
Monotypic moth genera
Moths of North America
Pyralidae genera